Leonard Gaskin (August 25, 1920 – January 24, 2009) was an American jazz bassist born in New York City.

Gaskin played on the early bebop scene at Minton's and Monroe's in New York in the early 1940s. In 1944 he took over Oscar Pettiford's spot in Dizzy Gillespie's band, and followed it with stints in bands led by Cootie Williams, Charlie Parker, Don Byas, Eddie South, Charlie Shavers, and Erroll Garner. In the 1950s, he played with Eddie Condon's Dixieland band, and played with Ruby Braff, Bud Freeman, Rex Stewart, Cootie Williams, Billie Holiday, Stan Getz, J.J. Johnson, and Miles Davis.

In the 1960s he became a studio musician, playing on numerous gospel and pop records. In the 1970s and 1980s he returned to jazz, playing with Sy Oliver, Panama Francis, and The International Art of Jazz.

Gaskin became involved in educating young people later in his life. He performed and shared his knowledge with elementary students with the Good Groove Band (Leonard Gaskin, Melissa Lovaglio, Bob Emry, Michael Howell) at Woodstock Elementary School in Woodstock, New York in 2003.

Gaskin died of natural causes on January 24, 2009.

Discography

As leader
 1961 – Leonard Gaskin at the Jazz Band Ball, (Swingville)
 1962 – Darktown Strutter's Ball, (Swingville)

As sideman
 1945 – Miles Davis: First Miles (Savoy)
 1946 – Don Byas: 1946 (Classics)
 1949 – J. J. Johnson / Kai Winding / Bennie Green: Trombone by Three (OJC)
 1949 – J. J. Johnson: J. J. Johnson's Jazz Quintets (Savoy)
 1950 – Charlie Parker: Charlie Parker All Stars – Charlie Parker at Birdland and Cafe Society (Cool & Blue, 1950–52)
 1950 – Stan Getz: The Complete Roost Recordings (Roost, 1950–54)
 1951 – Illinois Jacquet: Jazz Moods (Verve)
 1953 – Miles Davis: Miles Davis with Horns (Prestige/OJC)
 1955 – Billie Holiday: Lady Sings the Blues (Verve)
 1955 – Sonny Terry / Brownie McGhee: Back Country Blues
 1956 – Jimmy Scott: If Only You Knew (Savoy)
 1956 – Big Maybelle: Candy (Savoy)
 1956 – Sammy Price: Rock (Savoy)
 1957 – Bud Freeman: Chicago / Austin High School Jazz in HiFi (RCA)
 1957 – Eddie Condon: The Roaring Twenties (Columbia)
 1958 – Ruby Braff: Easy Now (RCA)
 1958 – Rex Stewart: Rendezvous with Rex (Felsted)
 1959 – Rex Stewart & Dicky Wells: Chatter Jazz (RCA Victor)
 1959 – Marion Williams: O Holy Night (Savoy)
 1960 – Lightnin' Hopkins: Last Night Blues (Bluesville, [1961])
 1960 – Arbee Stidham: Tired of Wandering (Bluesville, [1961])
 1960 – Sonny Terry: Sonny Is King (Bluesville [1963])
 1960 – Al Smith: Midnight Special (Bluesville, [1961])
 1960 – Roosevelt Sykes: The Honeydripper (Bluesville, [1961])
 1960 – Sunnyland Slim: Slim's Shout (Bluesville, [1961])
 1960 – Lightnin' Hopkins: Lightnin' (Bluesville, [1961])
 1960 – Curtis Jones: Trouble Blues (Bluesville)
 1960 – Shakey Jake: Mouth Harp Blues (Bluesville, [1961])
 1960 – Mildred Anderson: No More in Life (Bluesville, [1961])
 1962 – Rhoda Scott: Hey! Hey! Hey! (Tru-Sound)
 1962 – Odetta: Sometimes I Feel Like Cryin' (RCA Victor)
 1963 – Willis Jackson: Grease 'n' Gravy, The Good Life (Prestige) 
 1963 – Lightnin' Hopkins: Goin' Away (Bluesville)
 1963 – Red Holloway: The Burner (Prestige)
 1963 – Jimmy Witherspoon: Blues Around the Clock (Prestige)
 1963 – Bob Dylan: The Freewheelin' Bob Dylan (Columbia)
 1964 – Lightnin' Hopkins: Down Home Blues (Bluesville)
 1964 – Lightnin' Hopkins: Soul Blues (Prestige [1965])
 1964 – Sonny Stitt: Primitivo Soul (Prestige)
 1965 – Illinois Jacquet:  Spectrum (Argo)
 1968 – Solomon Burke: King Solomon (Atlantic)
 2001 – Richard Negri: Meditations on a Downbeat, Words Spoken through Jazz (LightMoose)

References
Footnotes

General references
[ Leonard Gaskin] at AllMusic

External links
‘I’ll Be Seeing You’Reminiscences Allegro at Local 802 (AFM)

1920 births
2009 deaths
American jazz double-bassists
Male double-bassists
Musicians from New York City
20th-century American musicians
Jazz musicians from New York (state)
20th-century double-bassists
20th-century American male musicians
American male jazz musicians
Savoy Records artists